Nikola Glišić (born 30 June 1999) is a Serbian football right back who plays for IMT, on loan from Red Star Belgrade.

References

External links
 
 

1999 births
Living people
Association football forwards
Serbian footballers
Serbian First League players
FK IMT players
Footballers from Belgrade